Clarence Green is an American academic administrator serving as the interim president for Northwest Missouri State University (NW). 
Previously, Green served as vice president of culture at Northwest Missouri State University. Green has a doctorate in educational leadership and policy analysis from the University of Missouri-Columbia and has served on the U.S. Attorney General Law Enforcement Coordinating Committee (LECC). 
Green has served as the head of the NW university police since 1997.

See also
Governance in higher education

References

External links
 Official website

American academics
Educators from Missouri
Northwest Missouri State University alumni
University of Missouri alumni
Living people
People from Maryville, Missouri
Year of birth missing (living people)